Fábio Gonçalves dos Santos, commonly known as Fábio (born 19 September 1978 in São José dos Campos, Brazil) is a Brazilian football goalkeeper, who last played for Botafogo-SP.

Career
He was second choice behind fellow Brazilian Marcos after signing for Marítimo in 2006 from ADAP. Goiás officially signed the former Portuguesa's goalkeeper on 12 May 2010.

References

1978 births
Living people
People from São José dos Campos
Brazilian footballers
Brazilian expatriate footballers
C.S. Marítimo players
Primeira Liga players
Campeonato Brasileiro Série A players
Associação Portuguesa de Desportos players
Association football goalkeepers
Mogi Mirim Esporte Clube players
Associação Atlética Ponte Preta players
Adap Galo Maringá Football Club players
Associação Atlética Internacional (Limeira) players
Goiás Esporte Clube players
Oeste Futebol Clube players
Criciúma Esporte Clube players
Associação Desportiva São Caetano players
Botafogo Futebol Clube (SP) players
Brazilian expatriate sportspeople in Portugal
Expatriate footballers in Portugal
Footballers from São Paulo (state)